Baqerabad (also Romanized as Bāqerābād; also known as Bagher Abad and Baqirābād) is a village in Gavkhuni Rural District, Bon Rud District, Isfahan County, Isfahan Province, Iran. At the 2006 census, its population was 408, in 101 families.

References 

Populated places in Isfahan County